St Mary's Church is a church in Broughton Astley, Leicestershire. It is a Grade II* listed building.

History
The church dates to 1220 but the nave walls contain evidence that there was an earlier building dating from c1100. It consists of a tower with spire, nave, chancel and north aisle.

The church was restored in 1881-82 by W. Bassett-Smith and the north porch was built in 1897. The tower used to have coats of arms for the Beauchamp, Astley and Willoughby families but these have now gone. The north aisle has a stained glass window depicting the Blessed Mary holding keys by the font.

By the entrance to the church is a holy water stoup. There are 8 bells in the tower, the earliest dating from 1637 and the newest from 1972.

Sir John Grey, the second cousin of Lady Jane Grey, and his mother, Lady Anne Grey, were buried in the chancel but were moved to the cemetery on Frolesworth Road.

External links

Church website with historical and other information

References

Broughton Astley
Broughton Astley